Chlaenius spoliatus is a species of ground beetle native to the Palearctic (including Europe), the Near East, and North Africa. In Europe, it is found in Albania, Austria, the Balearic Islands, Bosnia and Herzegovina, Bulgaria, the Canary Islands, Corsica, Crete, Croatia, the Czech Republic, European Turkey, mainland France, mainland Greece, Hungary, mainland Italy, Moldova, North Macedonia, Poland, Romania, central and southern Russia, Sardinia, Sicily, Slovakia, Slovenia, mainland Spain, Ukraine, Yugoslavia.

External links
Chlaenius spoliatus at Fauna Europaea

Licininae
Beetles of Europe
Beetles described in 1792
Taxa named by Pietro Rossi